

Sleaford Bay is a bay located in the Australian state of South Australia on the southern coast of Eyre Peninsula. It was named by the British navigator, Matthew Flinders in 1802.

Extent & description

It lies between the headland of Cape Wiles at its western extremity and headland of Cape Tournefort at its eastern extremity.

History
The bay was named after the town of Sleaford in Lincolnshire, England by the British navigator, Matthew Flinders in 1802.

The Barngarla name for Sleaford Bay is Dhanana. 

The Baudin expedition who visited after Flinders gave it two names – Baudin used the name Anse des Nerlans while Peron and Freycinet revised it to Baie Lavoisier after Baudin’s death.

A whaling station located on the coastline within Fishery Bay was in operation from 1839 to 1841.

Settlements and infrastructure
The coastline of Sleaford Bay is occupied by the locality of Sleaford in the west and by the locality of Lincoln National Park in the east.

As of 2005, port infrastructure within the bay consisted of a boat ramp located in Fishery Bay.

Proposed seawater desalination plant 
In 2018, a proposal to construct a 3 gigalitre per year seawater desalination plant at Sleaford Bay was announced. Land was purchased in July and the project is expected to cost $80 million to complete. The location is one of several prospects previously earmarked by SA Water in 2009.

Protected area status
The Thorny Passage Marine Park occupies the full extent of the bay while the Lincoln National Park extents to Mean Low Water Mark on its eastern side.

References

Bays of South Australia
Eyre Peninsula
Whaling stations in Australia